Campiglossa turneri is a species of tephritid or fruit flies in the genus Campiglossa of the family Tephritidae.

Distribution
The species is found in Australia.

References

Tephritinae
Insects described in 1996
Diptera of Australasia